George Martens (born September 23, 1958, in Elmont, New York) is a retired champion jockey in American Thoroughbred horse racing best known for winning the 1981 Belmont Stakes, the third leg of the United States Triple Crown of Thoroughbred Racing.

In 1976, George Martens was the top rated apprentice jockey in the United States, voted the Eclipse Award as the country's Outstanding Apprentice Jockey. In 1981 he earned the most important win of his career when he rode Summing to victory in the Belmont Stakes.

Martens retired from riding in 1985 but returned to racing the following year. Following his permanent retirement, he has worked as an exercise rider at Belmont Park. Some of the horses he has prepped include Lemon Drop Kid, Touch Gold, Sharp Humor, and Colonial Affair.

References 

1958 births
Living people
American jockeys
Eclipse Award winners
People from Elmont, New York